Jana is a genus of moths from Africa in the family Eupterotidae. The genus was erected by Gottlieb August Wilhelm Herrich-Schäffer in 1854.

Species
Jana ampla Berger, 1980
Jana anyagudae Stoneham, 1966
Jana aurivilliusi Rothschild, 1917
Jana basoko Berger, 1980
Jana caesarea Weymer, 1909
Jana demoulini Berger, 1980
Jana dulcinea Stoneham, 1966
Jana eurymas Herrich-Schäffer, 1854
Jana fletcheri Berger, 1980
Jana fontainei Berger, 1980
Jana forbesi Berger, 1980
Jana gaitea Stoneham, 1966
Jana germana Rothschild, 1917
Jana hecqui Berger, 1980
Jana jeanae Stoneham, 1966
Jana kivuensis Berger, 1980
Jana nigrorufa Berger, 1980
Jana overlaeti Berger, 1980
Jana plagiatus Berger, 1980
Jana preciosa Aurivillius, 1893
Jana propinquestria Strand, 1911
Jana pujoli Berger, 1980
Jana roseata Rothschild, 1917
Jana rustica Strand, 1911
Jana seydeli Berger, 1980
Jana transvaalica Strand, 1911
Jana tripunctata (Aurivillius, 1898)
Jana vandeschricki Berger, 1980
Jana variegata Rothschild, 1917
Jana viettei Berger, 1980
Jana yokoana (Bethune-Baker, 1927)

Former species
Jana cosima Plötz, 1880
Jana gracilis Walker, 1855
Jana palliatella Viette, 1954
Jana polymorpha Aurivillius, 1893
Jana sciron Druce, [1888]
Jana subrosea Aurivillius, 1893

References

Janinae